Saint Ignatius Gymnasium is one of the five categorial gymnasia (a type of school) in Amsterdam, Netherlands. Together with the Vossius Gymnasium, the Barlaeus Gymnasium and Cygnus Gymnasium it is among the most prestigious schools in Amsterdam. Ignatius is located in the Jan van Eijckstraat in the affluent 'Old South' district of Amsterdam.

It is one of the few Catholic gymnasiums in the Netherlands, founded in 1895.  Originally a Jesuit school, it is named after the founder of the Jesuit Order Ignatius of Loyola. The school is fairly small and has a student population of about 900 with 70 staff.

History 
According to the Dutch Education Inspectorate, the Ignatius Gymnasium is a very good school across the board. In the first three years, 2% has to repeat a class while 76% of the survivors pass their exams at once with an average grade of 6.9. All this is considered to be better than average. According to YELP, Ignatius ranks first among middle and high schools in Amsterdam. The Dutch magazine Elsevier chooses the Ignatius Gymnasium for several years as one of the best schools in the Netherlands. The school was elected as the best school in the province of North Holland in 2004. In 2010, Elsevier placed the school alongside ‘The winners of 2010, least repeaters and best exam results’.

The school newspaper is called De Harpoen.

Notable alumni

 Bertus Aafjes, a writer
 Paul Biegel, author of children's books
 Frans Brüggen, conductor and record player
 Paul Josef Crutzen, a Nobel Prize winner
 Bernard Delfgaauw, professor of philosophy at the University of Groningen
  beer magnate from the Heineken company
 Rad Kortenhorst, former president of the House of Representatives 
 Frans van der Lugt, Jesuit priest murdered in Homs, Syria
 Joseph Luns, former Secretaries-General of NATO
 Lambert Meertens, former chairman of the PSP
 Ivo Niehe, television personality
 Eric Niehe, Olympic rower and former Dutch Ambassador in India
 Jaap de Hoop Scheffer, former Secretaries-General of NATO 
 Pieter Seuren, a linguist
 Piet Steenkamp, founder of the CDA
 , an architect
 , a journalist 
 , former editor of De Groene Amsterdammer
 Charles van Rooy, former Minister of Social Affairs  
 Edo de Waart, conductor 
 Constant Nieuwenhuys, painter, visual artist and writer. 
 , former chairman of the employers' organization VNO-NCW

See also
 List of Jesuit schools
 List of Jesuit sites in the Netherlands

References

External links
 Ignatius Gymnasium

Educational institutions established in 1895
Schools in Amsterdam
Gymnasiums in the Netherlands
1895 establishments in the Netherlands
Defunct Jesuit schools
Christian schools in the Netherlands